Roland Jokl (born 26 July 1962) is an Austrian former athlete who specialised in sprinting events. He represented his country at the 1983 World Championships reaching the quarterfinals of the 200 metres. In addition, he finished fourth in the final at the 1984 European Indoor Championships.

International competitions

Personal bests
Outdoor
100 metres – 10.44 (+1.0 m/s, Judenburg 1983)
200 metres – 20.61 (-0.7 m/s, Vienna 1983)
400 metres – 47.28 (Nanjing 1985)
Indoor
60 metres – 6.78 (Vienna 1983)
200 metres – 20.98 (Vienna 1984)

References

All-Athletics profile

1962 births
Living people
Austrian male sprinters
World Athletics Championships athletes for Austria